Reza (Ray) Ahmadi ( Persian: رضا احمدی) is an iranian singer epic music.

career

Foolad
He started his career with Foolad from youth levels. Later he joined to first team by Dragan Skočić and signed a three-year contract which kept him at Foolad until 2017. He made his debut for Foolad in the 2nd fixture of the 2014–15 Iran Pro League against Persepolis as a substitute for Soroush Rafiei.

career statistics

References

External links
 Reza Ahmadi at IranLeague.ir

Living people
Iranian footballers
Foolad FC players
1993 births
People from Dezful
Association football defenders
Sportspeople from Khuzestan province